In the Quechuan languages of South America, a huaca or wak'a is an object that represents something revered, typically a monument of some kind. The term huaca can refer to natural locations, such as immense rocks. Some huacas have been associated with veneration and ritual. The Quechua people traditionally believed every object has a physical presence and two camaquen (spirits), one to create it and another to animate it. They would invoke its spirits for the object to function.

Huacas in Peru
Huacas are commonly located in nearly all regions of Peru outside the deepest parts of the Amazon basin in correlation with the regions populated by the pre-Inca and Inca early civilizations. They can be found in downtown Lima today in almost every district, the city having been built around them. Huacas within the municipal district of Lima are typically fenced off to avoid graffiti.

Huacas along ceremonial routes
A huaca could be built along a processional ceremonial line or route, as was done for the enactment of sacred ritual within the capital at Cusco. Such lines were referred to as ceques. The work of Tom Zuidema and Brian Bauer (UT-Austin) explores the range of debate over their usage and significance.

These lines were laid out to express the cosmology of the culture and were sometimes aligned astronomically to various stellar risings and settings. These pertained to seasonal ceremonies and time keeping (for the purposes of agriculture and ceremony and record keeping). These ceque lines bear significant resemblance to the processional lines among the Maya (sacbe), the Chacoans, and the Muisca (Suna).

Special compounds were erected at certain huacas where priests composed elaborate rituals and religious ceremonial culture. For instance, the ceremony of the sun was performed at Cusco (Inti Raymi). Incas elaborated creatively on a preexisting system of religious veneration of the peoples whom they took into their empire. This exchange ensured proper compliance among conquered peoples. The Incas also transplanted and colonized whole groups of persons of Inca background (Mitmaq) with newly adopted peoples to arrange a better distribution of Inca persons throughout all of their empire in order to avoid widespread resistance. In this instance, huacas and pacarinas became significant centers of shared worship and a point of unification of ethnically and linguistically diverse peoples. They helped to bring unity and common citizenship to often geographically disparate peoples. Since pre-incan times the people developed a system of pilgrimages to these various shrines, prior to the introduction of Catholicism.

References

External links
 Early Monumental Architecture on the Peruvian Coast
 The Solstice Project

Inca mythology